The Amber Room is a complete chamber decoration of amber panels backed with gold leaf and mirrors in Tsarskoye Selo, Russia.

Amber Room may also refer to:

The Amber Room, a 1992 novel by T. Davis Bunn
The Amber Room, a 1995 novel by Christopher Matthew
The Amber Room (novel), a 2003 novel by Steve Berry
The Amber Room, a 2005 investigative, non-fiction book by Catherine Scott-Clark and Adrian Levy